The 2021–22 Ranji Trophy was the 87th season of the Ranji Trophy, the premier first-class cricket tournament in India. The tournament was split into two phases, with the league stage being played from 17 February to 15 March 2022, and the knockout phase played from 6 to 26 June 2022. Due to the delayed start of the tournament because of the COVID-19 pandemic, teams were split into eight Elite groups, instead of five as per previous editions, and the Plate Group. The seven teams that won their Elite Group with the best points progressed to the knockout phase. They were joined by the winner of the pre-quarter-final match between the Elite Group winning team with the fewest points and the winner of the Plate Group.

In the opening round of fixtures, Sakibul Gani of Bihar became the first player to score a triple century on their first-class debut. In their Plate Group match against Mizoram, he scored 341 runs.

Following the conclusion of the group stage, Madhya Pradesh, Bengal, Karnataka, Mumbai, Uttarakhand, Punjab and Uttar Pradesh had all won their respective groups to qualify for the quarter-finals. Jharkhand won Group H and Nagaland won the Plate Group to advance to the preliminary quarter-final match. In the first innings of the preliminary quarter-final, Jharkhand were bowled out for 880 runs, the fourth-highest team total in the Ranji Trophy. Jharkhand then extended their lead to 1,008 runs, the biggest ever lead in first-class cricket, progressing to the quarter-finals based on their first innings lead. Mumbai, Uttar Pradesh and Madhya Pradesh all won their quarter-final matches to advance to the semi-finals. Bengal also reached the semi-finals, after they drew their match against Jharkhand, progressing in the tournament due to having a first-innings lead.

In the first semi-final, Madhya Pradesh beat Bengal by 174 runs to reach their first final in the tournament since the 1998–99 edition. The second semi-final, between Mumbai and Uttar Pradesh was drawn, with Mumbai advancing to the final on their first-innings lead. In the final, Madhya Pradesh beat Mumbai by six wickets to win their first Ranji Trophy title. It qualified for the 2023-24 Irani Cup.

Background
The 2021–22 Ranji Trophy was initially scheduled to take place from 13 January to 20 March 2022. The previous edition of the tournament was cancelled due to the COVID-19 pandemic. However, on 4 January 2022, the Board of Control for Cricket in India (BCCI) confirmed that the tournament had been postponed due to an increase of COVID-19 cases in India. The BCCI announced that they would try to host the league stage of the Ranji Trophy before the start of the 2022 Indian Premier League in April. Later in January 2022, the BCCI said that they were looking at the possibility of holding the tournament in two phases, from February to March, and June to July.

Originally, the tournament was scheduled to start on 16 November 2021, but was later postponed to 5 January 2022 and again to 13 January 2022. As per previous editions, the tournament would have been divided into six groups, with six teams in five Elite Groups and eight teams in the Plate Group. The winners of each Elite Group would have progressed directly to the quarter-finals, with the second-placed teams and the winner of the Plate Group playing in pre-quarters matches to determine the final eight teams.

Teams
The teams were placed in the following groups:

League stage

Group A

Group B

Group C

Group D

Group E

Group F

Group G

Group H

Plate Group

Knockout stage

Preliminary quarter-final

Quarter-finals

Semi-finals

Final

Statistics

Most runs

Most wickets

Broadcasters 
Star Sports and Disney+ Hotstar aired selective matches on TV and internet respectively. BCCI's website broadcast highlights and scores.

Notes

References

External links
 Series home at ESPN Cricinfo

Ranji Trophy seasons
Ranji Trophy Trophy
Ranji Trophy
Ranji Trophy
Ranji Trophy, 2021-22